Bellevue Medical Center (BMC) founded in July 2009, is a community hospital is located in Mansourieh, Lebanon. It offers healthcare services in many specialties. It has a capacity of 130 beds within its eight floors. Bellevue Medical Center is a Joint Commission International (JCI) accredited and Planetree Gold designated hospital.

Departments and services
Bellevue Medical Center provides Medical treatment services in the following specialties:
Allergology
Anesthesiology & Pain Management

Cardiology
Dermatology
Emergency Care
Endocrinology
Family Medicine
Gastroenterology
General Surgery
Hematology
Immunology
Infectious diseases
Intensive Care Unit
Internal Medicine
In-Vitro Fertility
Neonatal Intensive Care
Nephrology
Neurology
Neurosurgery
Obstetrics & Gynecology
Oncology
Ophthalmology
Orthopedics
Otolaryngology (ENT)
Pediatrics
Plastic Surgery
Psychiatry
Pulmonary Medicine
Rheumatology
Urology
Vascular Surgery

As well, it has the following clinical services:
Chemotherapy
Clinical Laboratory
Clinical Nutrition
Dialysis

Pharmacy
Psychotherapy & Counseling
Radiology
Rehabilitation & Physical Therapy
Respiratory Therapy

In addition, BMC has:
Maternity Center offering all prenatal, peri-natal, and post-natal services.
Training Center providing training and education about various medical topics to and from healthcare professionals.

Affiliation
The hospital is also affiliated with Lebanese and European centers of medical education, Saint Joseph University, Lebanese American University.

In 2017, Bellevue Medical Center became affiliated with Planetree that draws the principles on the patient centered care approach.

Certificates
BMC received the Joint Commission International accreditation, for patient safety and quality for healthcare, in October 2012 becoming one of three Lebanese hospitals to meet JCI standards; BMC was re-accredited by the JCI in 2015 and 2018.

In march  2014,  Bellevue Medical Center won the ‘Quality Improvement and Patient Safety’ Award at the MedHealth MENA Congress and was nominated for the green hospital award.

In March 2017, Bellevue Medical Center was accredited with HACCP certification for food safety.

Bellevue Medical Center is awarded the Best Health Operator of the year 2017 by “International Finance Magazine”.
In June 2018, Bellevue was the first hospital in Lebanon to be granted the Planetree gold designation.

Location

Located on the eastern bank of the Beirut River in the Mansourieh's Qanater Zubayda region, Bellevue Medical Center overlooks an ancient Roman aqueduct known to locals as Qanater Zubayda (Zubayda's Arches). It is 5 minutes away from Mkalles roundabout and 15 minutes away from downtown Beirut.

References

2009 establishments in Lebanon
Hospital buildings completed in 2009
Hospitals in Lebanon
Hospitals established in 2009